Sheep, Dog and Wolf may refer to:
 Sheep, Dog 'n' Wolf, 2001 video game based on Looney Tunes
 Sheep, Dog & Wolf (21st century), New Zealand musician

See also 
 Herding dog
 Livestock guardian dog